Demet Şener (born 11 April 1977) is a Turkish actress and former model who was Miss Turkey 1995.

Biography 
Demet Şener was born youngest of three children, in İstanbul. She studied at Nişantaşı Kız Lisesi and began modeling in 1994. In 1995, she won the Miss Turkey pageant and competed in the Miss World pageant.

She presented the shows Vip Suare and Şans Direksiyonu, and acted in the series Bir Demet Tiyatro and Böyle mi Olacaktı. In 1999, she acted in the comedy film Kahpe Bizans directed by Gani Müjde and in the same year, she acted in the film Asansör directed by Mustafa Altıoklar. In 2000, she acted in the film Hemşo.

She was married to national basketball player İbrahim Kutluay and they have two children.

Filmography

References

External links 
 

   

1977 births
Living people
Actresses from Istanbul
Miss Turkey winners
Turkish female models
Turkish film actresses
Turkish television actresses